Jagadamba Nepali Dharamshala is a Nepali Dharamshala (religious rest house) in Varanasi, India. Established in 1960 (2017 BS) by a single donation of Rani Jagadamba Kumari Devi, wife of Lt.-Gen. Madan Shumsher JBR. Jagadamba Nepali Dharamshala provides basic accommodation at a minimal cost. It is currently run by Vidya Dharma Pracharini Nepali Samiti, a committee made up of Nepali people living in Varanasi.

History
Varanasi, as a prominent Hindu pilgrimage town, was an attraction for Nepali Hindus. In order to safely and cheaply help and accommodate Nepali pilgrims and travelers in Varanasi, Rani Jagadamba Kumari Devi, wife of Lt.-Gen. Madan Shumsher JBR, daughter-in-law of Maharaja Prime Minister Chandra Shumsher JBR, on her single endorsement established this Nepali Dharamshala.

Nepala Library
A small library is also established at the Dharmashala, locally known as Nepala Library. The library has a vast collection of religious texts, Nepali, Hindi and Sanskrit literature, and also has a newspaper and magazine.

Jagadamba Nepali Dharamshala at Rameswaram
Rani Jagadamba Kumari Devi also established a Nepali religious rest house, Dharmashala at Rameswaram, Tamil Nadu, in 1959 (2016 BS). Currently the caretaker and his family have taken over the Dharmashala and use it for their personal use against the will of the endorses Jagadamba Kumari Devi.

Gallery

See also
Jagadamba Kumari Devi
Vidya Dharma Pracharini Nepali Samiti

References

Buildings and structures in Varanasi
Dharmshalas